Adam DiMarco (born ) is a Canadian actor. He has played recurring roles in the Syfy series The Magicians (2016–2020) and the Netflix series The Order (2019–2020). In 2022, he portrayed Albie Di Grasso in the HBO series The White Lotus.

Early life and education
DiMarco was born and raised in Oakville, Ontario, Canada, and indicates he is half-Italian. He began acting in elementary school, starring in stage productions. DiMarco studied life sciences at McMaster University for a year before dropping out. Feeling unhappy, he moved to Vancouver and enrolled in Vancouver Film School to study acting.

Career
Early in his career, DiMarco played Gavin, the love interest to the title character played by Debby Ryan, in the 2012 Disney Channel Original Movie Radio Rebel, and played Adam in the 2014 Disney Original Movie Zapped. He has played several recurring roles, including Kirby on the on the television series Arctic Air from 2012 to 2013, and Todd on the Syfy television series The Magicians from 2016 to 2020.

From 2019 to 2020, DiMarco starred as Randall Carpio on the Netflix television series The Order. In 2022, he starred as Albie Di Grasso, a recent Stanford graduate who travels to Sicily with his father and grandfather to learn more about their heritage, on the second season of the HBO television series The White Lotus.

Filmography

Film

Television

References

External links 
 

Living people
Canadian male film actors
Canadian male television actors
Canadian people of Italian descent
Year of birth missing (living people)
Male actors from Ontario
McMaster University alumni